Eugen Waldemar Schauman (Evgeny Vladimirovich Shauman); ( – ) was a Swedish-speaking Finnish nationalist and nobleman. Schauman assassinated the Imperial Russian Governor-General of Finland Nikolai Ivanovich Bobrikov.

Early life and family

Eugen Schauman was born in Kharkov, Russia (now Kharkiv, Ukraine) to Swedish-speaking Finnish parents. His mother was Elin Maria Schauman, and his father was Fredrik Waldemar Schauman, a general-lieutenant in the Imperial Russian army, who also served as a privy councillor and senator in the Finnish government.  His brother Rafael was born in 1873, and his sister Sigrid in 1877.  The family moved often due to Waldemar's work with the government.

As a young child, he was inspired by his mother's reading of The Tales of Ensign Stål by Johan Ludvig Runeberg. These told of the resistance to attempted Russification and oppression that had been going on in Finland for the better part of the 19th century.  Runeberg's tales became an important connection to Schauman's distant homeland, which he longed to see.  At the age of eight, Schauman heard that there was a collection going on in Nykarleby, Finland to erect a memorial to the victory over the Russians that had occurred in the 1808 Battle of Jutas in the Finnish War.  Inspired by Runeberg's tales, Schauman wanted to contribute to the plan, and sent a letter from Radom, Poland to Finland that contained a single ruble and read: "Please accept this small contribution to the memorial of Jutas. ~Eugen Schauman, Radom 24 May 1883"  Schauman's mother died the following year, in autumn 1884, when he was nine years old.  

Schauman attended secondary school in Helsinki, Finland while the rest of the family was living in Poland. He had poor hearing, however, and this had an effect on his studies. Nonetheless, Schauman matriculated at the Nya Svenska Läroverket in 1895; graduated from the University of Helsinki with an upper degree in government studies in 1899; and began his career as a clerk in the senate in 1901. He was a temporary employee working as an assistant to the school governing board. The job became permanent in 1903. In addition to his job at the senate, Schauman arranged for a series of marksmanship courses aimed at local students in Helsinki. These courses later became a part of the White Guards training.

Political activism

Language manifesto 

Schauman observed and experienced the formalization of the controversial Russification of Finland policy firsthand with the February 1899 decree of the February Manifesto. His father, Waldemar Schauman, resigned as senator in the summer 1900 as a protest against the manifesto, that had made the Russian language a compulsory subject in all Finnish schools. At first Schauman acted against the oppression like the other students: joining protests at the Runeberg statue; spreading leaflets calling for the will to battle and hatred towards the Russians; and gathering names for the Great Petition in Uusimaa.

Shooting practice 
Gradually Schauman, like other students and activists, started to move from passive resistance to active resistance. He organised shipments of weapons from abroad by shipping American rifles to Finland with the help of the Finnish Hunting Association, which were then distributed to students. In addition to this, he organised shooting clubs around the Helsinki area that taught marksmanship to students and other youths. Soon Schauman and other activists started planning an armed revolution. As well as his father's loss of his job, Schauman was angered by the dismissal of his uncle, Colonel Theodor Schauman, from the command of the Finnish Dragoon Regiment, a unit from Lappeenranta, in December 1901, after Nikolai Bobrikov had not been satisfied with this  inspection of it.

Draft riot 
Schauman became personally involved with Russian authorities during the riots in Helsinki connected to the draft strikes on 18 April 1902. Thousands of Finns participated in demonstrations at Senate Square angered by the draft conducted at the Russian Guard barracks. The governor of the Uusimaa Province, Mikhail Kaigorodov, had sent the Cossacks to end the demonstrations. Schauman was returning from work to his home on Koulukatu, but went to see what was happening on the square. A group of a few Cossacks intercepted him on Hallituskatu, pushed him against a wall, and started to whip him on the head. When one of the Cossacks went for his sabre, Schauman took his knife and stabbed at his chest. The blade of the knife twisted when it hit a metal part of the Cossack's uniform. The Cossack was, however, thrown off his horse and Schauman escaped to the stairway of the chemistry building of the university. According to a witness, he was "...shaking with anger..."

Kagal 
After the Cossack riots, Bobrikov became convinced that Finland was undergoing a kramola (or "secret rebellion"). The Tsar awarded Bobrikov dictatorial powers in 1902.  As the Russian oppression worsened, the underground passive-resistance organisation, Kagal, decided that it was time to move to stronger acts of defiance, as passive-resistance methods were no longer effective.  For example, in 1902 over half of the age class had skipped the draft to the Russian army, which had been made mandatory for Finns. In 1903 the draft strike was no longer as effective, and only 22 percent skipped the draft. "Emergency measures", meaning assassination, was accepted as a new way to act against the strengthening Russification. Many leading Kagal members had already been exiled at this point. At first, the plan was to strike against Finnish politicians agreeing with the Russification, but soon the activists, the Kagal organization, and Schauman decided it was best to strike against the Governor-General Nikolai Bobrikov, who was seen as the leader and main activist of the oppression politics.

Assassination 

The possible assassination of Bobrikov was a topical question among the Finnish activists of the time. Other activist groups are known to have made assassination plans, but Schauman convinced them to give him two weeks before they would intervene.  When Bobrikov came to the Senate house on 16 June, Schauman shot him three times—and then himself twice in the chest—using an FN Browning M1900 pistol. Schauman died instantly. Two of the bullets that hit Bobrikov ricocheted off his military decorations, but the third bounced back from his buckle and caused severe damage to his stomach. Bobrikov did not die immediately but was taken to the Helsinki Surgical Hospital. Surgeon  worked to save his life, but Bobrikov died the following day at 1:10 a.m.

Aftermath 

Schauman's body was taken to an unmarked grave in the Malmi cemetery in Helsinki.

Schauman's legacy 
Schauman left a letter in which he stated that he justified his actions as a punishment for Bobrikov's crimes against the people of Finland. He addressed the letter to the Tsar and wanted him to pay attention to the problems in the whole of the Russian empire, especially in Poland and the Baltic Sea region. He claimed he had acted alone and emphasized that his family was not involved in the assassination.

Schauman became something of an icon for the resistance to Imperial Russia, and many Finns still consider him a hero. His fame can be characterized by his ranking as the 34th greatest Finn of all time in the 2004 Suuret suomalaiset (Greatest Finns) television poll. At the location of the assassination in the hallway of the Council of State, there is a memorial plaque that states Se Pro Patria Dedit ("Given Himself for His Country"). Jean Sibelius composed the funeral march In Memoriam in memory of him.

Historical perspective
The importance of Schauman in history divides opinions. In the summer of 2004, a hundred years after Bobrikov's murder, Prime Minister Matti Vanhanen condemned the act, calling Schauman a terrorist. According to him, events like the assassination of Bobrikov are not appropriate to celebrate in the era of the war on terror. A discussion arose from the statement, in which Unto Vesa, amanuensis of the Peace and Conflict Research Institute, agreed with Vanhanen.

Notes

References

External links 
 
 Centennial article about the assassination in Helsingin Sanomat international edition, 15 June 2004

1875 births
1904 suicides
20th-century Finnish criminals
Finnish male criminals
People from Kharkov Governorate
Swedish-speaking Finns
Finnish people of German descent
19th-century Finnish nobility
20th-century Finnish nobility
Finnish assassins
Finnish nationalists
Nationalist assassins
Suicides by firearm in Finland
Multiple gunshot suicides
Murder–suicides in Finland